Arlind Pirani (born 26 October 1990 in Shkodër) is an Albanian footballer who most recently played as a striker for KS Burreli in the Albanian First Division.

Club career
He started his career at hometown club Vllaznia and after playing for unfashionable sides  Mamurrasi and Tërbuni as well as a spell in Kosovo, Pirani ended up with Burreli in 2012.

References

1990 births
Living people
Footballers from Shkodër
Albanian footballers
Association football forwards
KF Vllaznia Shkodër players
KF Adriatiku Mamurrasi players
KF Tërbuni Pukë players
KF Liria players
KS Burreli players
Kategoria Superiore players
Kategoria e Parë players
Football Superleague of Kosovo players
Albanian expatriate footballers
Expatriate footballers in Kosovo
Albanian expatriate sportspeople in Kosovo